is a railway station located in Bifuka, Nakagawa District, Kamikawa Subprefecture, Hokkaidō, Japan. It is operated by the Hokkaidō Railway Company.

Lines served
JR Hokkaidō
Sōya Main Line

Adjacent stations

External links

Railway stations in Hokkaido Prefecture
Railway stations in Japan opened in 1911